Noura Alameeri (born 22 October 1988) is a Kuwaiti professional racing cyclist. She rode in the women's road race at the 2016 UCI Road World Championships, but she did not finish the race.

References

External links
 

1988 births
Living people
Kuwaiti female cyclists
Place of birth missing (living people)